The King Rama II Memorial Park is in the Amphawa District of Thailand's Samut Songkhram Province. It serves as a memorial for King Phutthaloetla Naphalai (Rama II) and his patronage of Thai art and culture. The King Rama II Museum and a large traditional Thai house are located within the grounds of the park.

References

Tourist attractions in Samut Songkhram province
Parks in Thailand
Monuments and memorials in Thailand